"Pelasta maailma" is the first single from the CMX album Rautakantele. It also appears on the compilation album Cloaca Maxima. The chorus contains a quote from a poem by L. Onerva. "Pelasta maailma" means "Save the World" in Finnish.

Track listing 
"Pelasta maailma"—4:15
"Joet (acoustic live)"—3:52

Cover versions 
Antti Tuisku, Minun jouluni (2005)
Vesa-Matti Loiri, Ivalo (2006)

Personnel 
A. W. Yrjänä -- vocals, bass
Janne Halmkrona -- guitar
Timo Rasio—guitar
Pekka Kanniainen -- drums
Mara Salminen -- keyboards, backing vocals
Susanna Eronen—backing vocals
Essi Wuorela—backing vocals
Satu Sopanen -- kantele
Risto Salmi -- soprano saxophone
Kikke Heikkinen—backing vocals
Kaarina Kilpiö -- percussion
Keijo Puumalainen—percussion
Ville Leppänen -- distorted slide guitar

See also 
 CMX discography

References

External links 
 The song's lyrics on cmx.fi

CMX (band)
Finnish songs
1995 singles